The 2010 G20 Seoul Summit was the fifth meeting of the G20 heads of government/heads of state, to discuss the global financial system and the world economy, which took place in Seoul, the capital of South Korea, on November 11–12, 2010. South Korea was the first non-G8 nation to host a G20 leaders' summit.

The G20 is the premier forum for discussing, planning, and monitoring international economic cooperation.

The theme of the summit was "Shared Growth Beyond Crisis".

Agenda 
The summit leaders addressed several mid- and long-term policy issues, including
 Ensuring global economic recovery
 Framework for strong, sustainable, and balanced global growth
 Strengthening the international financial regulatory system
 Modernizing the international financial institutions
 Global financial safety nets
 Development issues
 The risk of a currency war

Representatives met in advance of the leaders' summit. These sherpas were tasked to draft a closing statement for the summit. The debate over currency exchange rates and imbalances was reported to have been "heated".

Preparations 

The summit logo incorporated two images: the sun rising over the sea and a traditional Korean lantern (cheongsachorong).

Originally, three new artificial islands built on the Han River between the Banpo and Dongjak bridges were going to be used as the main venue. However, delayed construction of the islands led for the main summit venue to relocate to COEX Convention & Exhibition Center.

The Republic of Korea Armed Forces and Seoul Metropolitan Police Agency provided security for the venues.

A group of South Korean artists, consisting of Gyu-ri, Seohyun, Jun. K, Changmin, Jaekyung, Jonghyun, Sungmin, Kahi, Luna, Ji Eun, Junhyung, Gayoon, Min, G.O, Bumkey, G.NA, Son Dam-bi, Seo In-guk, IU, and Anna, credited as Group of 20 recorded a song titled "Let's Go" for the summit.

Transportation
Most world leaders and international media arrived via Incheon International Airport and traveled to the summit venue via motorcades along the highway from the airport.

Transportation around the summit venue was upgraded with electric buses to help media and others around the city.

Attendance

The participants of the Seoul summit included the leaders and representatives of core members of the G20, which comprises 19 countries and the European Union, which is represented by its two governing bodies, the European Council and the European Commission. Representatives from other countries and regional organizations were invited to take part in the summit.

The South Korean government declined to invite the Netherlands, which had been invited to attend all four previous G20 summits. A Korean spokesman said that "a certain region had been over-represented" in the past; and for this Asian summit, Singapore was invited.

This was the first summit at which there were four women among the leaders. In addition to President Cristina Fernández de Kirchner of Argentina, Prime Minister Julia Gillard of Australia, Chancellor Angela Merkel of Germany, and the president-elect of Brazil, Dilma Rousseff, accompanied her nation's delegation.

This was the first G20 summit for Australia's Prime Minister Gillard, who had only been elected shortly before the Toronto summit. This was also the first opportunity for Prime Minister Lee Hsien Loong of Singapore to listen and to make his voice heard at the G20 leaders' meetings.

Security
Security for the G20 summit presented a unique array of problems. In addition to the security of the main venue, COEX, South Korea was more broadly responsible for providing a safe venue for the delegations who come to the summit. The National Police Agency led the security detail for the summit, both at the convention venue and the airport as well. Other police and security agencies involved were:

 Presidential Security Service
 National Intelligence Service
 Ministry of National Defense
 National Emergency Management Agency

In preparation, anti-terrorism drills were held by members of the South Korean police, military, special forces and private sector as part of the 2010 Ulchi-Freedom Guardian exercises against simulated hostage situations and chemical, biological and radiological attacks as a preparation for the summit.

Plans for accommodating peaceful protesters were paired with plans for mitigating disruptive demonstrations.

The G20 raised security concerns unrelated to demonstrators protesting the presence of the leaders of 20 economies in Seoul. For example, some analysts projected that anything perceived as a success for South Korea would be simultaneously construed in Pyongyang as a threat to North Korea.

Despite public endorsements by attending leaders, most commentators looking back on the summit have argued that only limited progress was made, especially on the headline issue of currency war and addressing trade imbalances. Leaders were generally unable to agree on key issues, with commentators such as economist Eswar Prasad noting the absence of the sense of unity that had been present at summits during the worse of the global financial crisis of 2007–2009. IMF managing director Dominique Strauss-Kahn said this particular summit was "more of a G20 debate than a G20 conclusion".

Relating to the need to rebalance the world economy, agreement had been reached to work on indicative guidelines which will set suggested maximum limits for current account surpluses and deficits, though these are not due to be fleshed out until 2011. G20 leaders also agreed to endorse the Seoul Development Consensus, a set of guidelines and principles for working together with less development nations to improve economic growth and reduce poverty. In contrast to the older Washington Consensus which it supersedes, the Seoul Consensus is less free market–orientated, allowing a larger role for state intervention.

See also 
 Club of Madrid

References

External links

 G20 Information Centre
G-20 website of the OECD
 Graphic: G20 is not simply the 20 largest economies
  Official website
 2010 Seoul G20 Tour
 Report by the Club of Madrid focussing on the G20s role in the post-crises world
 Supplementary annex doc G20 issued for the Seoul Development Consensus
 Lead-up to the G20: Korea as Convener and Innovation Economy-Podcast

2010
2010 conferences
2010 in economics
2010 in South Korea
Diplomatic conferences in South Korea
21st-century diplomatic conferences (Global)
2010s in Seoul
November 2010 events in South Korea